A partial solar eclipse will occur on Monday, June 1, 2076. A solar eclipse occurs when the Moon passes between Earth and the Sun, thereby totally or partly obscuring the image of the Sun for a viewer on Earth. A partial solar eclipse occurs in the polar regions of the Earth when the center of the Moon's shadow misses the Earth.

Related eclipses

Solar eclipses 2076–2079

Saros 119 
It is a part of Saros cycle 119, repeating every 18 years, 11 days, containing 71 events. The series started with partial solar eclipse on May 15, 850 AD. It contains total eclipses on August 9, 994 AD and August 20, 1012 with a hybrid eclipse on August 31, 1030. It has annular eclipses from September 10, 1048 through March 18, 1950. The series ends at member 71 as a partial eclipse on June 24, 2112. The longest duration of totality was only 32 seconds on August 20, 1012. The longest duration of annularity was 7 minutes, 37 seconds on September 1, 1625. The longest duration of hybridity was only 18 seconds on August 31, 1030.

References

External links 

2076 in science
2076 6 1
2076 6 1